Kelman Ltd. is a Northern Ireland-based company that produces advanced monitoring and diagnostics technologies for large electrical transformers. It is a fully owned subsidiary of General Electric (GE Energy). Kelman's DGA division was acquired by GE in August 2008 for $50M  and the company's product line became part of GE Energy's Transmission & Distribution Automation business.

Early years
Kelman was initially focused on the electrical distribution. During the first years of operation Kelman developed a number of award-winning products, including a low voltage autorecloser, a circuit breaker analyser and fault location equipment.

Railway sector
In 2002 Kelman became involved in the railway sector and launched SIGNET, an automatic reconfiguration system for the power supplied to the rail signalling network.

Dissolved Gas Analysis
Early in 2003 Kelman moved into the area of Dissolved Gas Analysis (DGA), which is the essential test for condition monitoring of electrical transformers. Kelman produced both portable and on-line DGA equipment, which are currently in use by many utility companies.

Sales offices
Kelman's HQ is in Northern Ireland (UK). Sales is handled by GE sales regional teams

References

External links
Kelman's website

Engineering companies of Northern Ireland